Hackmanina is a subgenus of flies belonging to the family Lesser Dung flies.

Species
O. czernyi (Duda, 1918)

References

Sphaeroceridae
Diptera of Europe
Diptera of Asia
Insect subgenera